Louis Joseph Joel (12 September 1864 – 6 May 1949) was a New Zealand cricketer who played for Otago. He was born and died in Dunedin.

Lou Joel made a single first-class appearance for Otago, during the 1899–1900 season, against Auckland at the Auckland Domain. Jack Harkness had been named in the side but was injured in an accident, and Joel, who was in Auckland on business, filled the gap on the second day of the match as a full substitute after Otago had batted one short in the first innings. In his only innings, batting at number 11, he scored 1 not out.
 
Joel was a stalwart of the Albion Cricket Club in Dunedin, playing for it for more than 25 years, including 10 years as captain of the First XI. He also supported it financially. He later served on the Otago Cricket Association, including some time as president.

Joel's father was prominent Otago brewer and businessman, Maurice Joel, and his sister was the notable artist Grace Joel. Louis Joel married Lily Miller in October 1910. After retiring from cricket he co-founded a construction business with the McLellan brothers (William, James, and Duncan), which became one of the city's more successful companies. It was involved in the construction of many major civic structures in Otago and Southland, among them King Edward Technical College, Dunedin's St Paul's Cathedral, the Physics block of the University of Otago, and the former Southland Hospital in Invercargill.

See also
 List of Otago representative cricketers

References

External links
 
Louis Joel at CricketArchive 

1864 births
1949 deaths
New Zealand cricketers
Otago cricketers
New Zealand cricket administrators
Cricketers from Dunedin
New Zealand Jews
New Zealand businesspeople